Billboard publishes annual lists of songs based on chart performance over the course of a year based on Nielsen Broadcast Data Systems and SoundScan information. This is a list of the magazine's Top Hot 100 songs of 2008.

The #1 song on the list was "Low" by Flo Rida and T-Pain, after having released the song in 2007 and spent 10 weeks at number-one. The song that came in at number two was "Bleeding Love" by Leona Lewis and at #3 was Alicia Keys' song "No One", after spending 5 weeks at #1 in December 2007.

See also
2008 in music
List of Billboard Hot 100 number-one singles of 2008
List of Billboard Hot 100 top-ten singles in 2008

References 

United States Hot 100 Year-End
Billboard charts